This is a list of universities and colleges in Cyprus, including campuses of foreign universities.

Universities

For the full list of universities and colleges in Northern Cyprus, see.

Foreign university campuses in Cyprus

Ecclesiastical schools

The Cyprus Church Theological School (ΘΣΕΚ) was founded as a private school on June 19, 2015. It is under the auspices of the Church of Cyprus and will give students a theological education with the possibility of the scientific work and critical discussion. This degree course enables candidates to engage in the Orthodox priesthood.

Private Institutions of Tertiary Education

 American College (Nicosia)
 Aigaia School of Art and Design
 Alexander College
 Arte Music Academy
 Atlantis College
 Casa College
 CBS - College of Business Studies Cyprus
 CDA College
 Church of Cyprus - School of Theology
 City Unity College Nicosia
 Cyprus Academy of Art
 Cyprus College
 Cyprus International Institute of Management
 Cyprus School of Molecular Medicine
 Frederick Institute of Technology
 Freshart College of Arts
 Global College
 Institute of Professional Studies (IPS), UCLan Cyprus
 Intercollege
 InterNapa College (Ammochostos)
 KES College
 Larnaca College (Larnaka)
 Ledra College
 Mesoyios College (Lemesos)
 M.K.C. City College Larnaca (Larnaka)
 P.A. College (Larnaka)
 Susini College
 The CTL EuroCollege (Lemesos)
 The Cyprus Institute
 The Cyprus Institute of Marketing
 The Limassol College - T.L.C. (Lemesos)
 The Philips College
 Vladimiros Kafkaridis School of Drama

Defunct
 Cyprus College of Art
 Higher Technical Institute

See also
 Cyprus Academy of Sciences, Letters and Arts
 Education in Cyprus
 List of schools in Cyprus

Sources
Complete list of colleges and universities in Cyprus
Top Universities in Cyprus

External links
 Theological School of the Church of Cyprus (Orthodox)

Universities

Cyprus
Cyprus